Cereus trigonodendron, synonym Cereus braunii, is a species of flowering plant in the family Cactaceae, native to Bolivia, North Brazil and Peru. It was first described in 1908 by Ernst Heinrich Georg Ule who attributed the name to Karl Moritz Schumann. Ule described Cereus trigonodendron as a striking triangular columnar cactus, up to 15 m tall, with large purple flowers at the top.

References

trigonodendron
Flora of Bolivia
Flora of North Brazil
Flora of Peru
Plants described in 1908